Guy & Ralna are an American singing duo that appeared as regulars on television's The Lawrence Welk Show from 1970 to 1982.

Musical career
The act consists of Guy Hovis and Ralna English, who married in early 1969 and made their Welk debut on his Christmas show the same year. English had been a solo performer on the show for a few months, having already joined in mid-1969.  They specialize in country, gospel, big band and popular music.

The couple has released a number of albums, including Hymns We Love To Sing, which was nominated for a Dove Award in 1972. Country Songs We Love to Sing, released in 1973, peaked at No. 21 on the Billboard Country Albums chart. Their popularity peaked in the 1970s, at which time they had their own fan club and made numerous appearances on other television shows and commercials.

When the Welk show ended in 1982, and later when the couple divorced in 1984, the act disbanded for a while. They have since reunited professionally and have continued to perform, both at PBS pledge specials and in concert venues. They have also performed at political appearances of U.S. Senator Trent Lott.

Discography

References

External links
Guy & Ralna at Allmusic.com

American gospel musical groups
American country music groups
Country music duos
Married couples
Musical groups established in 1970